Turkey was represented by Buket Bengisu and Grup Safir with the song "Leylaklar Soldu Kalbinde".

Before Eurovision

25. Eurovision Şarkı Yarışması Türkiye Finali 
The final took place on 15 February 2002 at the TRT Studios in Ankara, hosted by Ömer Önder and Nazli Meltem Ersan. Five songs competed and the winner was determined by a ten-member jury, who all voted for Buket Bengisu and Grup Safir.

At Eurovision
On the night of the contest Buket Bengisu and Grup Safir performed 19th in the running order, following Germany and preceding Malta. At the close of the voting, "Leylaklar Soldu Kalbinde" had received 29 points, placing Turkey 16th out of 24 contestants.

Voting

References

2002
Countries in the Eurovision Song Contest 2002
Eurovision